Akhtar Rasool (born 13 January 1954) is a field hockey player, captain and olympian from Pakistan who won the gold medal with the Men's National Hockey Team at the Hockey World Cup 1978, and again in 1982. He played as Center Half for the Pakistan hockey team. Akhtar is considered one of the creative geniuses in centre-half recovery and ball distribution.

Background and education
Akhtar Rasool was born in Faisalabad District of Pakistan, formerly known as Lyallpur. His father was Chaudhry Ghulam Rasool and was himself a world-renowned hockey Olympian beside being an eminent educationist. Akhtar graduated from Government College Lahore. During his college days, Akhtar remained the captain of the College Hockey team. He was awarded "Roll of Honor" and "College Color" for his excellent performance in hockey.

Career
Akhtar was noted for his clean playing style and performance and as such was first included in the Pakistani national hockey team in 1971. He was a player of relaxed approach but extreme courage, control and poise were hallmarks of his excellence in a highly demanding position at centre-half. From 1971 till 1982, Akhtar played numerous national and international matches, displaying his superior skills in hockey.

He had an exceptional technique and a knack of passing the ball to the right player at the right time.  In the latter part of his hockey career, Akhtar made a great mark for himself.

He played a crucial role in Pakistan's victories in 1978 and 1982 Hockey World Cup. In 1982, Akhtar captained the Pakistani team for the Hockey World Cup Championship held in Bombay and won a gold medal for Pakistan by defeating W. Germany in the finals.

After Bombay Hockey World Cup, Akhtar retired in a blaze of glory as skipper of the side which had won the gold in 1982. By then, he had the singular distinction of being the only player to have played in four World Cups.

Akhtar also played in the 1972 Summer Olympics held at Munich, 1976 Summer Olympics held at Montreal and won Silver and Bronze Medals in 1972 and 1976, respectively.

He was a good pivot and played important role in Pakistani victories in 1978 and 1982 Hockey World Cups. He was also awarded highest civil award Pride of Performance by the Pakistani Government in 1983.

After his retirement from professional hockey, he was elected as the President of Pakistan's hockey supreme body the PHF. This was to be only for a term of one year. He took over at a time when the PHF was bankrupt and had just gotten out of the 1996 players revolt just before the world cup. He worked diligently and his hard work paid off and he was elected for another term as the President. He was supposed to continue till the year 2002.

He then served as the chairman of the selection committee in the year 2002, and at that time too, his focus was the development of Pakistani hockey. He ensured that the players were helped in each possible way to maintain their consistency. He is still an active member of Pakistani hockey. He is either coaching or training young lads in Pakistan with the same motto and that is promotion of Pakistan hockey.

Akhtar Rasool was elected unopposed as the president of the Pakistan Hockey Federation in 2013 but could not perform as well as expected this time. "Pakistan had secured eighth position in the qualifying event for the Olympics held in Belgium and as a result failed to qualify for the 2016 Olympic Games. It was the first time in the game's history that Pakistan missed out on a spot at the Olympics."

After retirement
Akhtar retired from active hockey after winning Hockey World Cup, at Bombay in 1982.  He remains active in hockey by coaching or training young players in Pakistan with the primary intention of promoting Pakistani hockey.

Akhtar has held the offices of President of Punjab Sports Board; President, Punjabi Hockey Association; and President, Punjab Athletics Association. In 1997, he was elected Chief of Pakistan Hockey Federation (PHF)---Pakistan's hockey supreme body—for a one-year term. He took over the reins at a time when the PHF was almost bankrupt and had gotten out of the 1996 players revolt just before the Hockey World Cup.  He was re-elected PHF chief for a second term till 2002 but resigned in 1999 for personal reasons. He then served as the Chairman of the selection committee in 2002.

Awards and recognition
In 1983, Akhtar was awarded Pride of Performance, the highest civil award by the Pakistani Government, in recognition of his contributions to Pakistani hockey.

In active politics
After retirement from active hockey, Akhtar entered politics in 1985. He contested as an independent and was elected MPA to Punjab Assembly. In 1986, he became Excise and Taxation Minister of Punjab. In 1988, he was elected from P.P 128 Ichhra on Islami Jamhuri Itihad ticket and became the Sports Minister of Punjab.
In 1990, he again contested on Islami Jamhoori Ittehad party ticket and was elected MLA with a big margin. In 1993, he contested Parliament seat on Muslim League ticket and became MPA (Member of Provincial Assembly).

References

External links
 

1954 births
Living people
Pakistani male field hockey players
Olympic field hockey players of Pakistan
Olympic silver medalists for Pakistan
Olympic bronze medalists for Pakistan
Olympic medalists in field hockey
Medalists at the 1972 Summer Olympics
Medalists at the 1976 Summer Olympics
Field hockey players at the 1972 Summer Olympics
Field hockey players at the 1976 Summer Olympics
Asian Games medalists in field hockey
Field hockey players at the 1974 Asian Games
Field hockey players at the 1978 Asian Games
Government College University, Lahore alumni
Recipients of the Pride of Performance
Sportspeople from Faisalabad
Asian Games gold medalists for Pakistan
Medalists at the 1974 Asian Games
Medalists at the 1978 Asian Games
Punjab MPAs 1985–1988
Punjab MPAs 1988–1990
Punjab MPAs 1990–1993
Punjab MPAs 1993–1996
1978 Men's Hockey World Cup players